Route 156 is a highway in northern Missouri.  Its eastern terminus is at Route 6 in Ewing; its western terminus is at Route 149 in northwestern Macon County.

Major intersections

References

156
Transportation in Macon County, Missouri